Cassiar Cannery station is a railway station on the Canadian National Railway mainline in Port Edward, British Columbia. It is located on the north shore of the Inverness Passage across from Smith Island. The station is served by Via Rail's Jasper–Prince Rupert train. A single road, Skeena Drive, connects the station with central Port Edward and British Columbia Highway 16.

References 

Via Rail stations in British Columbia